Pedro Vega Zambrano (born June 29, 1958) is a Mexican football manager and former player.

References

External links

1958 births
Living people
Footballers from Mexico City
Mexican footballers
Association football midfielders
Club América footballers
Toros Neza footballers
Mexican football managers